Dr. Dávid Dorosz (born October 6, 1985) is a Hungarian jurist, author, political strategist, campaign manager and politician, who has been the Deputy Mayor of Budapest for Climate and Development since November 2019. Dorosz was a member of the National Assembly (MP) from 2010 to 2014. He is member and former COO of the Dialogue for Hungary party. He is the author of the book "Time pressure - How we can avoid a global collapse?" which analyzes global challenges from a progressive angle.

Early life
Dorosz was born in Angyalföld, District XIII of Budapest. He graduated from Szilágyi Erzsébet Grammar School in 2004. After that he studied in the Faculty of Law at the Eötvös Loránd University where he graduated in 2009. Besides studying, he worked as a trainee for several years in a law firm. He edited cultural and external programs for an online radio between 2006 and 2008. He is one of the founders of the Humana, a youth journal for human rights.

He joined Politics Can Be Different in the Spring of 2009. He served as campaign manager of the party for a mayoral by-election of Józsefváros in the Autumn of 2009. He also functioned as campaign manager for the 2010 parliamentary election. With Dorosz LMP achieved historic results making the organization the first-ever green party to clear the electoral threshold for the National Assembly.

MP
Dorosz was elected to the National Assembly of Hungary from the party's Budapest Regional List. He was a member of the Committee on Foreign Affairs from May 14, 2010 to March 7, 2011. Thereafter, he held a membership position in the Defence and Internal Security Committee and the Committee of National Cohesion. He ran for a seat in Angyalföld at the 2010 municipal elections. He served as board secretary of the party for a short time in 2011. He was appointed deputy leader of the LMP parliamentary group on November 26, 2012.

In January 2013, the LMP's congress rejected against the electoral cooperation with other opposition forces, including Together 2014. As a result members of LMP’s “Dialogue for Hungary” platform, including Dorosz, announced their decision to leave the opposition party and form a new organization. Benedek Jávor said he eight MPs leaving LMP would keep their parliamentary mandates. The leaving MPs established Dialogue for Hungary as a full-fledged party.

Dávid Dorosz ran as candidate of the Unity electoral alliance in Érd (Constituency I, Pest County) during the 2014 parliamentary election, but was defeated by incumbent MP András Aradszki (Fidesz) and lost his parliamentary mandate.

Business career and MBA studies in the USA
After the election Dorosz started a business career in the I.T. sector, where he led his company to a successful exit. He also lived in the United States for years finishing an MBA at Webster University.

2019 Mayoral election
He returned to the Hungarian politics by the 2019 local elections, becoming, alongside Zoltán Gál J., one of the two campaign managers of fellow Dialogue politician Gergely Karácsony, who was elected Mayor of Budapest. During the 10-month campaign Dorosz led the Karácsony-team through two rounds of primaries (first ones held in Hungary) and subsequently managed the joint Budapest campaign of the five opposition parties that supported his nominee. Dorosz was elected Deputy Mayor of Budapest for Climate and Development on 5 November 2019.

Book
Dorosz's book "Time pressure - How we can avoid a global collapse" was published in November 2019.

References

1985 births
Living people
Hungarian jurists
Eötvös Loránd University alumni
LMP – Hungary's Green Party politicians
Dialogue for Hungary politicians
Members of the National Assembly of Hungary (2010–2014)
Politicians from Budapest